The Verdict of Lake Balaton (Hungarian: Ítél a Balaton) is a 1933 Hungarian drama film directed by Pál Fejös and starring Antal Páger, Ernõ Elekes and Gyula Csortos. An English-language version, a German-language version Judgment of Lake Balaton (Menschen im Sturm) and a French-language version (Tempêtes) were also released.

Cast
 Antal Páger - János 
 Ernõ Elekes - Mihály 
 Gyula Csortos - Kovács 
 Mária Medgyesi - Mari
 Mór Ditrói - Szabó
 Erzsi Palotai - Síró asszony
 Elemér Baló - Toronyőr

Bibliography
 Buranbaeva, Oksana & Mladineo, Vanja. Culture and Customs of Hungary. ABC-CLIO, 2011.
 Burns, Bryan. World Cinema: Hungary. Fairleigh Dickinson University Press, 1996.
 Cunningham, John. Hungarian Cinema: From Coffee House to Multiplex. Wallflower Press, 2004.

External links

1933 films
Hungarian drama films
1930s Hungarian-language films
Films directed by Paul Fejos
Hungarian multilingual films
Films about fishing
Films set in Lake Balaton
Hungarian black-and-white films
1933 multilingual films